Olive May Osmond (née Davis; May 4, 1925 – May 9, 2004) was the matriarch of the American Osmond singing family.

Life and career

Osmond was born in Samaria, Idaho, the daughter of Vera Ann (née Nichols) and Thomas Martin Davis. She moved to Ogden, Utah, where she worked as a secretary. There she met and fell in love with George Osmond. They married on December 1, 1944. She was a member of the Church of Jesus Christ of Latter-day Saints.

Their first two children, Virl and Tom, were born with a degenerative condition which left them nearly deaf. Doctors warned the couple that future children had a higher chance of having hearing loss, but George and Olive wanted a large family.  The other children, Alan, Wayne, Merrill, Jay, Donny, Marie, and Jimmy, were born able to hear.

George formed a barbershop quartet consisting of Alan, Wayne, Merrill, and Jay. Singer Andy Williams' father saw their act at Disneyland, and from 1962-71, the Osmond Brothers appeared on The Andy Williams Show. Donny made his debut on the program the day after his sixth birthday.

The brothers eventually left The Andy Williams Show and were regulars on The Jerry Lewis Show for a year before launching a successful recording career. They—including Donny, Marie, and Jimmy as solo artists—scored several hits, The Osmonds' biggest being "One Bad Apple", which climbed to #1. From 1976-79, Donny and Marie hosted The Donny and Marie Show.

Marie played Olive in the 1982 TV film Side by Side: The True Story of the Osmond Family. Another 2001 TV movie, Inside the Osmonds, produced by Jimmy, depicted the brothers' egos, George's fiscal mismanagement, and the family's quest to build a multi-media empire as leading to their downfall. As a nurturer and because of her love for all children who are struggling, Olive leveraged her family's fame to start The Osmond Foundation, now known as the Children's Miracle Network which Marie continues to support.

Olive Osmond died on May 9, 2004, which was Mother's Day in the US and five days after her 79th birthday. The cause of her death was listed as complications from a stroke she had suffered on November 13, 2001. She died surrounded by her family, and is still remembered and loved by people everywhere as "Mother Osmond." Olive was survived by husband George (who died on November 6, 2007), their nine children, 55 grandchildren, and 22 great-grandchildren.

Olive shares a birthday with Katherine Jackson (born May 4, 1930), matriarch of the Jackson family, who performed in a similar group, and shared a friendly rivalry with the Osmonds in the 1970s.

Children
George and Olive Osmond had nine children:

(George) Virl Osmond Jr. (born October 19, 1945) 
Thomas Rulon "Tom" Osmond (born October 26, 1947)
Alan Ralph Osmond (born June 22, 1949)
(Melvin) Wayne Osmond (born August 28, 1951)
Merrill Davis Osmond (born April 30, 1953)
Jay Wesley Osmond (born March 2, 1955)
Donald "Donny" Clark Osmond (born December 9, 1957)
Olive Marie Osmond (born October 13, 1959)
James Arthur "Jimmy" Osmond (born April 16, 1963)

References

External links
 Official Osmond Family Site
 

1925 births
2004 deaths
American Latter Day Saints
People from Ogden, Utah
People from Oneida County, Idaho
Osmond family (show business)